The Supermarine Sea Lion II was a British racing flying boat built by the Supermarine Aviation Works. Designed by Reginald Mitchell, it was a modification of Supermarine's Sea King II. Sea Lion II was powered by a  Napier Lion engine.

It competed against two Italian aircraft.  flew the aircraft to victory at an average speed of —the first post-World War I success by a British aeroplane in an international competition.

For the following year's race, the aircraft's design was modified by Mitchell and re-engined. After this failure, Supermarine began designing seaplanes instead of flying boats as racers..

Development

The Schneider Trophy race for seaplanes and flying boats had been won by Italy in 1920 (by a Savoia S.19 flying boat, the only aircraft to take part in the meeting) and again in 1921 by a Macchi M.7, in another uncontested race. A third consecutive Italian victory would result in the Trophy being permanently retained by Italy, so Supermarine decided to enter the 1922 competition, with a self-funded entry (Italian and French entries were funded by their respective governments). In order to compete, Supermarine, based at Woolston, Southampton, developed a racing flying boat as a modification of their Sea King II fighter. The Sea King was a single-seat biplane amphibian powered by a  Hispano Suiza engine in pusher configuration that had first flown in 1921. It was of similar layout to the Supermarine Sea Lion I that had competed in the 1919 Schneider Trophy race, with the Sea Lion I a modified version of the earlier Supermarine Baby, a flying boat fighter aircraft of the First World War.

The aircraft was modified by Supermarine's chief designer and chief engineer, Reginald Mitchell, as a flying boat with a  Napier Lion engine, loaned by Napier. His modifications to the rudder and the fin caused the hull to have to be strengthened, which was accomplished by an extra layer of varnished fabric being stretched around the structure.

The Sea Lion II was registered as G-EBAH.

Schneider Trophy races
The Sea Lion II was entered into the 1922 Schneider Trophy race, which took place at Naples on 12 August 1922 after the Italians brought the initial date for the race forward by two weeks. High winds restricted the time available for the plane to be flight tested in England. The aircraft was dismantled before being put into crates and transported to Naples on board SS Philomel, free of charge. The Sea Lion II competed against two Italian aircraft, a Macchi S.7 and a Savioa S.19, with two French entrants failing to start the race. The course consisted of 13 laps, each of length . The victory was the first post-World War I success by a British aircraft in an international competition, and generated a large amount of publicity for Supermarine.

 
For the 1923 Schneider Race (held at Cowes on the Isle of Wight) the aircraft was re-engined with a  Napier Lion and renamed as Sea Lion III. The hull was modified by Mitchell to reduce drag forces, and he gave it two bay wings and a larger rudder area. Supermarine's managing director Hubert Scott-Paine said after the trophy was won by the Americans:

The British defeat caused Supermarine to abandon using outclassed flying boats as racers, in favour of seaplanes. The Sea Lion III was transferred to the Royal Air Force in 1923.

Operators

Royal Air Force
Supermarine Aviation Works

Specifications (Sea Lion II)

See also

References

Sources

Further reading

External links

 Supermarine Sea Lion – British Aircraft Directory

1920s British sport aircraft
Schneider Trophy
Flying boats
Sea Lion II
Single-engined pusher aircraft
Biplanes
Aircraft first flown in 1922